William Duncan (born 14 March 1880 in Kilsyth, Scotland) was a Scottish association football goalkeeper who played professionally in Scotland and the United States.

Duncan began his career with St Mirren F.C.  At some point, he moved to Celtic F.C. where he won the 1909-1910 league championship.  He also played for Airdrieonians  He then  moved to the United States where in 1915, he signed with Bethlehem Steel of the National Association Football League.  Duncan and his teammates won the 1915 National Challenge Cup.  He would go on to win the Cup another three times with Bethlehem, in 1916, 1918 and 1919.  In 1919, Duncan was part of the Bethlehem Steel tour of South America.  In 1922, he joined Fall River United in the American Soccer League.  He played only three games with the team before retiring, but not before playing against the Dick, Kerr Lady Soccer Team.

References

American soccer players
Airdrieonians F.C. (1878) players
American Soccer League (1921–1933) players
Bethlehem Steel F.C. (1907–1930) players
Celtic F.C. players
Fall River Marksmen players
Association football goalkeepers
National Association Football League players
Scottish footballers
St Mirren F.C. players
1880 births
Year of death missing
People from Kilsyth
Scottish expatriate sportspeople in the United States
Expatriate soccer players in the United States
Scottish expatriate footballers
Footballers from North Lanarkshire